A deed of gift is a signed legal document that voluntarily and without recompense transfers ownership of real, personal, or intellectual property – such as a gift of materials – from one person or institution to another. It should include any possible conditions specifying access, use, preservation, etc. of the gift, although these are generally discouraged by recipient institutions.

See also 
 Deed of Gift of the America's Cup
 Gift (law)
Common law legal terminology